The Europe Zone was one of the three regional zones of the 1981 Davis Cup.

23 teams entered the Europe Zone in total, split across two sub-zones. With the introduction of a new tiered format, the previous year's sub-zonal semifinalists bypassed Zonal competition and qualified directly for the new 16-team World Group. The remaining teams would now compete for two places in the following year's World Group.

Spain defeated Hungary in the Zone A final, and the Soviet Union defeated the Netherlands in the Zone B final, resulting in both Spain and the Soviet Union being promoted to the 1982 World Group.

Participating nations
Zone A: 

Zone B:

Zone A

Draw

First round

Monaco vs. Morocco

Egypt vs. Greece

Quarterfinals

Algeria vs. Spain

Monaco vs. Poland

Egypt vs. Hungary

Yugoslavia vs. Israel

Semifinals

Spain vs. Monaco

Israel vs. Hungary

Final

Spain vs. Hungary

Zone B

Draw

First round

Denmark vs. Portugal

Luxembourg vs. Bulgaria

Norway vs. Ireland

Quarterfinals

Austria vs. Denmark

Soviet Union vs. Belgium

Finland vs. Bulgaria

Netherlands vs. Ireland

Semifinals

Austria vs. Soviet Union

Finland vs. Netherlands

Final

Soviet Union vs. Netherlands

References

External links
Davis Cup official website

Davis Cup Europe/Africa Zone
Europe Zone